The 2009 Tour de San Luis was a men's road cycling race held from 19  to January 25, 2009, in Argentina. The third edition of this road racing event was a multiple stage race with seven stages and a total length of 1014 kilometres.

Stage summary

General Classification

References
 Report
 edosof

Tour de San Luis
Tour de San Luis
Tour de San Luis
January 2009 sports events in South America